Shera is a rural locality (a village) in Borovetskoye Rural Settlement, Sokolsky District, Vologda Oblast, Russia. The population was 71 as of 2002.

Geography 
Shera is located 48 km northwest of Sokol (the district's administrative centre) by road. Vlasyevo is the nearest rural locality.

References 

Rural localities in Sokolsky District, Vologda Oblast